The Harrington River is a  river in Washington County, Maine. It empties into Harrington Bay in Harrington, Maine.

See also
List of rivers of Maine

References

Maine Streamflow Data from the USGS
Maine Watershed Data From Environmental Protection Agency

Rivers of Washington County, Maine
Rivers of Maine